Sretensky Monastery may refer to:
 Sretensky Monastery (Kashin)
 Sretensky Monastery (Gorohovets)
 Sretensky Monastery (Moscow)
 Sretensky Monastery (Pereslavl-Zalessky)